Ole Albrechtsen (16 October 1924 – 9 February 2012) was a Danish fencer. He competed in the individual and team foil events at the 1948 Summer Olympics.

References

External links
 

1924 births
2012 deaths
Danish male fencers
Olympic fencers of Denmark
Fencers at the 1948 Summer Olympics
People from Gentofte Municipality
Sportspeople from the Capital Region of Denmark